Cyprus competed at the 2004 Summer Olympics in Athens, Greece, from 13 to 29 August 2004.

Athletics 

Cypriot athletes have so far achieved qualifying standards in the following athletics events (up to a maximum of 3 athletes in each event at the 'A' Standard, and 1 at the 'B' Standard).

Key
Note–Ranks given for track events are within the athlete's heat only
Q = Qualified for the next round
q = Qualified for the next round as a fastest loser or, in field events, by position without achieving the qualifying target
NR = National record
N/A = Round not applicable for the event
Bye = Athlete not required to compete in round

Men
Track & road events

Field events

Women
Track & road events

Field events

Cycling

Mountain biking

Judo

Sailing

Men

Women

Open

M = Medal race; OCS = On course side of the starting line; DSQ = Disqualified; DNF = Did not finish; DNS= Did not start; RDG = Redress given

Shooting 

Two Cypriot shooters qualified to compete in the following events:

Men

Swimming 

Cypriot swimmers earned qualifying standards in the following events (up to a maximum of 2 swimmers in each event at the A-standard time, and 1 at the B-standard time):

Men

Women

Tennis

See also
 Cyprus at the 2004 Summer Paralympics
 Cyprus at the 2005 Mediterranean Games

References

External links
Official Report of the XXVIII Olympiad
Cyprus Olympic Committee

Nations at the 2004 Summer Olympics
2004
Summer Olympics